Sulfalene (INN, USAN) or sulfametopyrazine (BAN) is a long-acting sulfonamide antibacterial used for the treatment of chronic bronchitis, urinary tract infections and malaria. As of 2014 there were only two countries in which it is currently still marketed: Thailand and Ireland. 

It was discovered by researchers at Farmitalia and first published in 1960 and was marketed as Kelfizina.

See also
Sulfadoxine

References 

Pyrazines
Sulfonamide antibiotics
Antimalarial agents
Phenol ethers
Italian inventions
Methoxy compounds
Anilines